Kari Nissena is an American actress, director, and producer. She both produced and starred in the award-winning 2006 film Cats on a Plane written by comedian Tim Powers. She won the Best Actress, Best Director, and Best Feature awards at the 2009 Oceanside International Film Festival. She also won Best Feature at the 2009 IndieFest USA.

Filmography

Film

Television

References

External links
 
 Kari Nissena Official website

Living people
Year of birth missing (living people)
American film actresses
American film directors
American film producers
American women film directors
American women film producers
21st-century American women